Cloverton may refer to:

 Cloverton (band), a Christian band from Manhattan, Kansas
 Cloverton, Minnesota, an unincorporated area in Pine County, Minnesota
 Cloverton, a residential development in the City of Hume (northern fringe of Melbourne) in Victoria, Australia

See also
 Clovertown